Islikon railway station, or Gachnang-Islikon railway station, is a railway station in the Swiss canton of Thurgau and municipality of Gachnang. It takes its name from the adjacent village of Islikon. The station is located on the Winterthur–Romanshorn railway line. It is an intermediate stop on Zürich S-Bahn services S24 and S30.

References

External links 
 

Islikon
Islikon